Sarajevo (French: De Mayerling à Sarajevo) is a 1940 French historical drama film directed by Max Ophüls and starring Edwige Feuillère, John Lodge and Aimé Clariond. Beginning in the aftermath of the Mayerling Incident, the film portrays the love affair and marriage between Archduke Franz Ferdinand of Austria and Sophie, Duchess of Hohenberg, leading up to their eventual assassination in 1914 in events that triggered the First World War. The film was not a commercial or critical success. Following the German occupation of France the film was banned, and Ophüls fled into exile for the second time.

Plot
In the late 1800's, Franz Ferdinand, heir to the Austro-Hungarian empire, falls for Sophie Chotek, a Czech countess. He's already a problem to the Crown because of his political ideas. In addition, a love affair with someone not of royal blood breeches protocol. The Crown allows the union only after the couple agrees to a morganatic marriage. Franz doesn't seem to care about the protocols of the time, provoking the emperor to further neutralize him by demoting him to inspector general of the army. In June 1914, fearing for his safety, Sophie seeks permission to accompany Franz to Sarajevo; protocol dictates that no army troops attend Franz while she is present. An assassin strikes. Their deaths spark World War I.

Partial cast
Edwige Feuillère as Countess Sophie Chotek
John Lodge as l'archiduc François-Ferdinand
Aimé Clariond as Prince of Montenuovo
Jean Worms as Emperor François-Joseph
Gilbert Gil as Gavrilo Princip
Jean Debucourt as Janatschek
Raymond Aimos as François-Ferdinand's valet
Gabrielle Dorziat as Archduchess Marie-Thérèse
 as Serbian ambassador
Gaston Dubosc as Count Chotek
Marcel André as Archduke Frédéric
Colette Régis as Archduchess Isabelle
Jacqueline Marsan as young archduchess
 as chamberlain

References

External links

French historical drama films
French black-and-white films
1940s historical drama films
Films directed by Max Ophüls
Films set in Austria
Films set in the 1880s
Films set in the 1890s
Films set in the 1900s
Films set in the 1910s
Films set in Vienna
Films set in Sarajevo
Biographical films about Austrian royalty
Films scored by Oscar Straus
Films about the assassination of Archduke Franz Ferdinand of Austria
Cultural depictions of Franz Joseph I of Austria
Cultural depictions of Archduke Franz Ferdinand of Austria
Cultural depictions of Gavrilo Princip
1940 drama films
Films set in Austria-Hungary
1940s French-language films
1940s French films